András Tállai (born 5 February 1959) is a Hungarian economist and politician, current Secretary of State for Parliamentary Affairs and Taxation, and also Deputy Minister of National Economy since 15 June 2014. Prior that he served as the Secretary of State for Municipalities between 2 June 2010 and 5 June 2014. He was also Political Secretary of Finance between 2001 and 2002. He became a member of the National Assembly (MP) for Mezőkövesd (Borsod-Abaúj-Zemplén County Constituency XIII then VII) in the 1998 parliamentary election. He served as Mayor of Mezőkövesd from 2002 to 2010. He holds a degree in business administration from the College of Finance and Accountancy and a degree in tax consulting and auditing.

References

1959 births
Living people
Hungarian economists
Mayors of places in Hungary
Fidesz politicians
Members of the National Assembly of Hungary (1998–2002)
Members of the National Assembly of Hungary (2002–2006)
Members of the National Assembly of Hungary (2006–2010)
Members of the National Assembly of Hungary (2010–2014)
Members of the National Assembly of Hungary (2014–2018)
Members of the National Assembly of Hungary (2018–2022)
Members of the National Assembly of Hungary (2022–2026)
People from Debrecen